The Red Monastery or The Monastery of Apa Psoi is a Coptic Orthodox monastery named after an Egyptian saint called Psoi or Pishoy (who is not to be confused with the famous Saint Pishoy). The name of the monastery is derived from the colour of the construction material of its outside walls, consisting of red (burnt) brick. These walls are considerably thicker at the base than at the top, and, just like the walls of Ancient Egyptian temples, they are surmounted by cavetto moldings. The Red Monastery is architecturally similar to the White Monastery.

Foundation and ancient history

The history of the foundation of the Red Monastery is not known, and it is thought to have been built at the fourth century AD. by an Egyptian saint called Pishay (who is not to be confused with the known Saint Pishoy). This saint was a contemporary of Saint Pigol, the founder of the White Monastery.

Almost nothing is known of the history of the Red Monastery (Deir al-Ahmar, Deir Anba Bishoi or Bishai) near Sohag, though it is one of the most famous Christian monasteries in Egypt. However, unlike the White Monastery it is situated within a small village, and some houses lie to the south and east. The area to the north and west of the monastery is mainly covered with debris.

Its name is derived from the colour of its construction material, consisting of red (burnt) brick, of its outside walls, which distinguishes it from its nearby neighbor, the White Monastery which is made of stone. These walls are considerably thicker at the base than at the top, and like ancient Pharaonic temples, as well as the White monastery, are surmounted by cavetto moldings. Otherwise, this monastery is architecturally similar to the White Monastery, and most likely its construction dates to the same period (probably the fifth century AD).

The monastery was dedicated to St. Pshoi (Bishoi in Arabic), who is not to be confused with the more celebrated individual who lived in the Wadi al-Natrun. He was a contemporary of Apa Pjol, the founder of the White Monastery. In fact, it was probably St. Pjol who founded this monastery as well. In his "Life of Shenute", Besa says that, "The holy apa Pjol and the young man Shenoute went out walking together, and with them also went apa Psoi (Pshoi) from Mt. Psoou. He too was a holy man who walked after godly things" (Besa 9, p. 44). Hence, one may identify "Psoou" (Psou) with the Red Monastery.

While the fifteenth-century Arab historian Al-Maqrizi names the monastery, he provides none of its history. The probable reason is that it was closely related to the White Monastery at that time. Dominique Vivant Denon visited the monastery during Napoleon's campaign in 1798-1799, but states that the facility had been ransacked and burned down by the Mamluks only a few days before his arrival. Currently, the monastery is apparently occupied by only a few monks, but the church still serves the Coptic communities of the surrounding villages, as well as the pilgrims who come here during the big feasts of the liturgical year.

The churches

The Church of Saint Pshoi (Bishoi) is situated in the northeastern corner of the monastery. We do know that the principal church of the monastery, named for St. Pshoi, was built during the second half of the fifth century, in the form of a basilica. It also is similar architecturally to the Church of St. Shenute in the White Monastery, though smaller. It too is built of red brick rather than stone. Measuring forty-four meters in length by twenty-three meters in width, the church does not have a west narthex like the Church of Shenute, but all other elements are identical. The nave has small side aisles connected on the west, and there are upper galleries, a triconch apses and a large rectangular room on the south side of the edifice.

There are elements within this church, however, that distinguish it from the Church of St. Shenute in the White Monastery. In the White Monastery, considerable building material was robbed from edifices dating to the pharaonic or Roman period, while in the Red Monastery church of St. Pshoi, the portals and columns (bases, shafts and capitals) were made for this building. Also, there is the addition of two columns before the presbytery in this church. The relative narrowness of the triumphal arch, for reasons of stability, created a discordance between the wide nave and the narrow passage into the presbytery, and the two columns was a clever artistic and architectural solution which resolved the aesthetic problems by removing the discrepancy between the dimensions of the nave and those of the entry to the sanctuary. In fact, this was such a brilliant idea that it was subsequently used in practically all churches having a narrow entry into the presbytery.

The triconch sanctuary is very fine. It has three apses that are embellished by two orders of superposed niches separated by small elegant columns. These columns are completely painted, and lend to the spaces' richness and sacredness. The motif of the broken tympanum surmounting each niche is particularly interesting. Attached to the haikal (sanctuary) screen that shields the sanctuary from the public areas are icons of Saints Shenute, Bishoi and Bigoul. The north and south apses have no altars.

Modern history
Currently, the monastery is occupied by a quickly growing number of monks. The several churches (most new) still serve the Coptic communities of the surrounding villages, as well as the pilgrims who visit during the big feasts of the Coptic liturgical year. More and more people from the surrounding area now come to the Red Monastery to hear Father Antonius speak.
Today the Red Monastery is also very significant for art and architectural historians. It includes the only monumental ensemble of architecture, sculpture, and paint (areas fully covered with paint) left from the Greek, Roman and late antique periods in the entire Mediterranean. The paint in the triconch area dates between the late fifth and the late sixth or early seventh century.

Since 2003, the American Research Center in Egypt has undertaken a restoration and conservation project with grant funding from the United States Agency for International Development. In 2017, a team of architectural conservators, under the direction of Nicholas Warner, completed a conservation project on the keep beside the south wall of the church which revealed an ancient hydraulic system of ceramic pipes.

See also
Coptic monasticism
Coptic architecture

References

The Red Monastery, Univ. of Minnesota
Red Monastery: Modern Doorway, Univ. of Minnesota
Hazel Hayer, Restoration for historic monastery gets underway in Egypt, travelvideo.tv

External links

Images from Dr. Enrique Abreu 2010 : Images from both Monasteries

Christian monasteries in Egypt
Coptic Orthodox monasteries
Christian monasteries established in the 4th century
Buildings and structures in Sohag Governorate